Zelenchuksky (masculine), Zelenchukskaya (feminine), or Zelenchukskoye (neuter) may refer to:
Zelenchuksky District, a district of the Karachay–Cherkess Republic, Russia
Zelenchukskaya, a rural locality (stanitsa) in the Karachay–Cherkess Republic, Russia
Special Astrophysical Observatory of the Russian Academy of Science, sometimes referred to as "Zelenchuksky"